Lahore Dry Port is a dry port located in Prem Nagar, Punjab, Pakistan.

History
Lahore Dry Port was the first dry port in Pakistan and originally opened in Mughalpura, Lahore. The dry port was constructed and managed by Pakistan Railways since 1973. In 2008, an agreement was signed between Pakistan Railways, Qasim International Container Terminal and Premier Mercantile Services to build a new dry port in Prem Nagar.

References

External links 
Transport in Lahore

Dry ports of Pakistan
Economy of Lahore